The Gold Line is a light rail transit line in the Sacramento Regional Transit District (RT) light rail system.  Operating between Sacramento Valley and Historic Folsom stations, the line runs primarily east-west in Sacramento (including downtown, Midtown, East Sacramento), portions of unincorporated Sacramento County, Rancho Cordova, Gold River and Folsom. Portions of the Gold Line run along the original initial alignment between 16th Street and Butterfield stations.

History

The first light rail line of the RT, which opened in 1987, was an  route between Watt/I-80 station in North Sacramento, through  downtown, and continuing east on Folsom Boulevard to Butterfield Way station. It was built at a cost of $176 million USD ($ adjusted for inflation), which included the cost of vehicles and maintenance and storage facilities. Much of the line, when it was first built, was single-tracked, though improvements over the 1990s allowed much of the original system to be double-tracked. The line was built mainly using the Sacramento Valley Railroad right-of-way, coupled with use of structures of an abandoned freeway project. A limited portion of the route runs on streets, mainly in downtown Sacramento.

The line became more popular than anyone anticipated, necessitating further expansions and improvements. Two new stations at 39th and 48th streets opened in 1995, and a  extension to the Mather Field/Mills station was completed the same year. Much of the extension follows a railroad right-of-way. When it opened, 7 new stops were added to the system.

In June 2005, following a reconfiguration of the light rail system, the Sunrise-Downtown Line was created (it formerly continued beyond the downtown St. Rose of Lima Park station to Watt/I-80); it runs from St. Rose/K-Street to Sunrise with an extension to the Folsom area that opened on October 15, 2005.  It has since been redesignated in color as the Gold Line. On December 8, 2006 it was extended even further to the downtown Amtrak depot (a.k.a. the Sacramento Valley Station), connecting the light rail system to the national rail system for the first time.

 headways are limited to 30 minutes on the line due to single tracking on the east end between Parkshore Drive and Bidwell Street. Sac RT released a study in 2020 on the possibility of adding additional passing sidings in the area to run twice as many trains in addition to reconfiguring station platforms for use with new low-floor rolling stock.

Line description
The Gold Line begins at its western terminus in downtown at the Sacramento Valley station where it connects with Amtrak.  From there it travels on H Street in a single-track, then diverges into one-way tracks for 7th and 8th Streets where it joins the Blue and Green Lines.  It then turns westward on O Street, southward on 12th, then eastward in an alley paralleling Q and R Streets.  After passing the 16th Street station, the Gold Line splits from the Blue Line (the Green Line terminates at 13th Street station), crossing over a bridge near The Sacramento Bee headquarters, before continuing on R Street in Midtown.  It continues in its own right-of-way in East Sacramento next to Highway 50, then crosses under Highway 50 and parallels Folsom Boulevard and the UPRR Placerville Branch Line, which is partly operational today, for most of its length. The Gold Line then reaches its eastern terminus at Historic Folsom station in Folsom, although some trains terminate at Sunrise station.

Station listing 
The following table lists the current stations of the Gold Line, from west to east.

References

External links

RT Light Rail map
Gold Line schedule

Sacramento Regional Transit District
Transportation in Sacramento, California
Public transportation in Sacramento County, California
Passenger rail transportation in California
Light rail in California
Railway lines opened in 1987
1987 establishments in California